Rex Simpson (18 November 1925 – 15 September 2017) was a New Zealand cricketer. He played in three first-class matches for Central Districts in 1955/56.

See also
 List of Central Districts representative cricketers

References

External links
 

1925 births
2017 deaths
New Zealand cricketers
Central Districts cricketers
Cricketers from New Plymouth